Charlotte Williams Memorial Hospital, also known as Memorial Hospital, is a historic hospital building located in Richmond, Virginia.  It was built between 1901 and 1903, and is a three-story, with basement, neo-Palladian Revival style building.  It has an "H"-shaped plan, and has brick and granite walls, steel joists, steel elevators and masonry stairs. In 1986, the Virginia Department of Transportation acquired the hospital and rehabilitated it for office use.

It was listed on the National Register of Historic Places in 2004.

References

Hospital buildings completed in 1903
Hospital buildings on the National Register of Historic Places in Virginia
Palladian Revival architecture in the United States
Buildings and structures in Richmond, Virginia
National Register of Historic Places in Richmond, Virginia